Banda Pir Khan is one of the 51 union councils of Abbottabad District in Khyber-Pakhtunkhwa, Pakistan.

It is located in the north of the district (to the north west of Abbottabad city) near the border with Mansehra District. The population of Banda Pir Khan and its surrounding hamlets is approximately 25,385.

Subdivisions
The Union Council is subdivided into the following areas: Band Pir Khan (main), Kalidhar, Mandrochh, Samesar, Bandi Dhundan, Tarnawai, Lon Patyan and Garlaniyan. Qalandarabad is the main town and junction of the union council, while Banda Pir Khan is the major village in the union council.

References

Union councils of Abbottabad District

fr:Tehsil d'Abbottabad